Jacob Bøckmann Barth (11 March 1822 – 27 March 1892 in Lillehammer) was a Norwegian forester.

Barth was born in Kristiansand to second lieutenant Nicolai Bøckmann Barth (1797–1846) and Elisabeth Charlotte Bruun (1796–1873). In 1855, he married Adelaide Magdalene Lange (1828–97), daughter of priest Carl Georg Lange (1778–1850) and Inger Sye. He had at least two sons, among them the forester Agnar Johannes Barth (1871–1948) as well as Hans Rasch Barth.

Graduating as cand.jur. (master's in law) in 1846, he received a government grant in 1852 for education in forestry. He traveled around the country between 1855 and 1860, providing the grounds to establish a national forestry authority. This was established in 1860, and Barth became district chief in Kristians Amt.

Bibliography 
He published several books.

 Indberetning om en i Lofoten og Vesteraalen foretagen zoologisk Reise, særtrykk av Nyt Magasin for Naturvidenskaberne, 1853
 Den norske Natur, skildret i Billeder fra Jagtlivet, 1856
 Om Almindingsskovene. Indberetning til Departementet for det Indre, 1857
 Om Skovene i deres Forhold til Nationaloeconomien, 1857
 Om Skovforholdene i Finmarken, 1858
 Om Skovforholdene i Gulbrandsdalen, 1858
 Veiledning i det Vigtigste af den norske Skovhuusholdning, 1864
 Optegnelser fra mit Jægerliv, 1865
 Skovsagen. Dens Udvikling, nærværende Stilling og Fremtid, 1871
 Erindringer fra Jagten paa det mindre Vildt i Norge, 1874
 Naturskildringer og Optegnelser fra mit Jæger- og Reiseliv, 1877
 Norges Fuglevildt og Jagten paa samme, København 1881
 Nogle Træk af Harmonien i Naturen, 1886
 Præstelærens Usandhed og den sande Kristendom, 1889

References

1822 births
1892 deaths
People from Kristiansand
People from Drangedal
Norwegian foresters